Alexandre Dorothée Marie Adriaan Charlotte Escher (14 June 1945 – 31 May 2021) was a Dutch mental health advocate and researcher.

Early life, family and education

Sandra Escher was born in The Hague, the Netherlands.

She trained at the School of Journalism in Utrecht.

Sandra began a three-year follow-up on 80 children hearing voices. On this research she earned her MPhil and PhD in Birmingham. She earned her PhD at the University of Maastricht.

Career
Escher began to work at the University of Maastricht, department of Social Psychiatry. She became also a senior staff member at the Community mental Health Centre in Maastricht in 1987. Since that time she works together with Marius Romme on the hearing voices project. With Romme she wrote two books which have been translated into several languages. With him she developed the Maastricht Interview for Voice hearers. Sandra organised eight annual well attended congresses and helped voice hearers to write their presentations. In 1999 she became an honorary research fellow at the University of Central England in Birmingham. She was a co-director of Intervoice.

Together with Wilma Boevink, she edited the book Making Sense of Self-Harm (2001). Since 2002, she participated in an international teaching project funded by the European community. She developed a module which trains voices hearers to use their experience to train professionals and uses the module to train experts by experience now. She was trainer in the Maastricht Interview.

She is also credited with developing Experience Focussed Counselling together with Marius Romme and Joachim Schnackenberg.

Personal life and demise

Escher died 31 May 2021 in Amsterdam at age 75.

Publications
Publications by Dr. Sandra Escher et al.:
Escher, A.D.M.A.C., Romme, M.A.J., Breuls, M., Driessen, G. (1987). Maatschappelijk kwetsbaar en langdurig psychiatrisch ziek zijn. Tijdschrift voor Psychiatrie, 29:5, 266–281.
Escher, A.D.M.A.C., Romme, M.A.J. (1989). Stemmen horen. Positieve effecten van leren omgaan met stemmen. Tijdschrift voor Ziekenverpleging 24, p. 784-788.
Escher, A.D.M.A.C., Romme, M.A.J. (1991). Het dagboek als communicatiemiddel bij auditieve hallucinaties. Tijdschrift voor Ziekenverpleging (TVZ) 15 augustus 1991 543-547 Escher., A.D.M.A.C. (1993). Stemmen horen: ziekte, gave, topervaring of fase in een groeiproces? Klankspiegel, maart 1993.
Escher, A., Romme, M. (1998). "Small talk: voice-hearing in Children". Open Mind July/August.
Escher, A., Romme, M., Buiks, A., Delespaul, Ph., Van Os, J. (2002a). Independent course of childhood auditory hallucinations: a sequential 3-year follow-up study. British Journal of Psychiatry. 181 (suppl. 43), s10-s18.
Escher, A., Romme, M., Buiks, A., Delespaul, Ph., Van Os, J. (2002b). Formation of delusional ideation in adolescents hearing voices: a prospective study. American Journal of Medical Genetics. 114: 913–920.
Escher, A.D.M., Romme, M.A.J., Buiks, A., Delespaul, Ph., Van Os, J. (2002). Kinderen en jeugdigen die stemmen horen: een prospectief driejarig onderzoek. Tijdschrift van de Vereniging voor kinder en jeugdpsychotherapie. Jaargang 29, nr. 4. blz. 4-21.
Escher, A., Romme, M. (2002). Het Maastrichts Interview voor kinderen en Jeugdigen (MIK). Tijdschrift van de Vereniging voor kinder en jeugdpsychotherapie. Jaargang 29, nr. 4. blz. 22–45.
Escher, A., Delespaul, P., Romme, M., Buiks, A., Van Os. J. (2003). Coping defence and depression in adolescents hearing voices. Journal of Mental Health. 12,1,91-99.
Escher, A. D., Romme, M. A., et al. (2003). Formación de la ideación delirante en adolescentes con alucinaciones auditivas: un estudio prospectivo. Intervención en crisis y tratamiento agudo de los trastornos psiquiátricos graves. P. Pichot, J. Ezcurra, A. González-Pinto and M. Gutiérrz Fraile. Madrid, Aula Médica Ediciones: 185–208.
Escher, A., Morris, M., Buiks, A., Delespaul, Ph., Van Os, J., Romme, M. (2004). Determinants of outcome in the pathways through care for children hearing voices. International Journal of social Welfare. 13, 208–222.
Romme, M.A.J., Escher, A.D.M.A.C. (2006). Nachwort. In Hannelore Klafki, Meine Stimmen – Quälgeister und Schutzengel. Texte einer engagierten Stimmenhörerin (pp. 175–178). Berlin / Eugene / Shrewsbury: Antipsychiatrieverlag. . (E-Book 2016)
Romme, M.A.J., Escher, A.D.M.A.C. (2007). Intervoice: Stimmenhören akzeptieren und verstehen. In Peter Lehmann & Peter Stastny (Eds.), Statt Psychiatrie 2 (pp. 134–140). Berlin / Eugene / Shrewsbury: Antipsychiatrieverlag. . (E-Book 2018)
Romme, M.A.J., Escher, A.D.M.A.C. (2007). Intervoice: Accepting and making sense of hearing voices. In Peter Stastny & Peter Lehmann (Eds.), Alternatives Beyond Psychiatry (pp. 131–137). Berlin / Eugene / Shrewsbury: Peter Lehmann Publishing.  (UK),  (USA). (E-Book 2018)
Pennings, M.H.A., Romme, M.A.J., Buiks, A.A.J.G.M. (1996). Auditieve hallucinaties bij patiënten en niet-patiënten. Tijdschrift voor Psychiatrie.
Noorthoorn, E., Dijkman, C., Escher, A., Romme, M. (1988). Resultaten van de enquête, in Omgaan met stemmen horen. Blz. 199–214. Uitgever; Vakgroep Sociale psychiatrie, Rijksuniversiteit Limburg. Noorthoorn,O., Romme, M.A.J., Escher A.D.M.A.C. (1990). Wat kunnen mensen die stemmen horen de psychiatrie leren?. Sociale Dienstverlening in Nederland. Analyse en evaluatie (Red. E.K. Hicks) p. 60-70. 
Romme, M.A.J., Escher, A., Radstake, D., Breuls, M. (1987). Een indeling in groepen van patiënten met een langdurige psychiatrische patiëntencarrière. Tijdschrift voor Psychiatrie, 29,4,197-211. 
Romme, M.A.J., Escher, A.D.M.A.C. (1987). Leren omgaan met het horen van stemmen. Maandblad Geestelijk Volksgezondheid 718, p 825–831. 
Romme, M.A.J., Escher, A.D.M.A.C. (Eds.) (1988). Research to practice in Community Psychiatry. van Gorkum, Maastricht/Assen. 
Romme, M.A.J., Escher, A.D.M.A.C., Habets, V.P.M.J.H. (1988). Omgaan met stemmen horen. (red). Universiteit Maastricht, vakgroep sociale Psychiatrie. 
Romme, M.A.J., Escher, A.D.M.A.C. Hearing Voices (1989). Schizophrenia Bulletin 15 (2): 209–216.
Romme, M.A.J., Escher, A.D.M.A.C. (1989). Effects of mutual contacts from people with auditory hallucinations. Perspectief no 3, 37–43, July 1989.
Romme, M.A.J., Escher, A.D.M.A.C. (1989). Stimmen hőren inKontakt, Zeitschrift der HPE Österreich nr 116, Oktober 1989. 
Romme, M.A.J., Escher, A.D.M.A.C. (1990). Effecten van het onderlinge contact tussen mensen die stemmen horen. Oostland no 2, 8–14. 
Romme, M.A.J., Escher, A.D.M.A.C. (1990). Heard but not seen. Open Mind No 49, 16–18.
Romme, M.A.J., Escher, A.D.M.A.C. (1991). Sense in voices. Open Mind 53, The mental health magazine, 9 November.
Romme, M.A.J., Escher, A.D.M.A.C. (1991). Undire le Voci. Spazi della Menten nr. 8, December 1991 p 3–9.
Romme, M.A.J., Honig, A., Noorthoorn, O., Escher, A.D.M.A.C. (1992). Coping with voices: an emancipatory approach. British Journal of Psychiatry 161, 99-103
Romme, M.A.J., Escher, A.D.M.A.C. (Eds.). Accepting Voices (1993, second edition 1998), 258 pages, MIND Publications, London. 
Romme, M.A.J., Escher, A.D.M.A.C. (Eds.) (1997). Acceptare le voice [Accepting Voices]. Giuffrè editore. Milano (in Italian)
Romme, M.A.J., Escher, A.D.M.A.C. (Eds.) (1998). Признание голосов  [Accepting Voices]. Kiev, Sfera.  (in Russian) 
Romme, M.A.J., Escher, A.D.M.A.C. (Eds.). Understanding voices: coping with auditory hallucinations and confusing realities (1996) First published by Rijksuniversiteit Maastricht, the Netherlands and also English edition, Handsell Publications.
Romme, M.A.J., Escher, A.D.M.A.C. (1997). Stimmen hőren akzeptieren. Psychiatrie-Verlag. Bonn.
Romme, M.A.J., Escher, A.D.M.A.C. (1997). Na compananhia das voces. Editorial Estampa, Lda., Lisboa Portugal. 
Romme, M.A.J., Escher, A.D.M.A.C. (1997). Moniääniset. Printway Oy, Vantaa. Finland. 
Romme, M.A.J., Escher, A.D.M.A.C. (1999). Omgaan met stemmen horen. Stichting Positieve Gezondheidszorg. Bemelen. 
Romme, M.A.J., Escher, A.D.M.A.C. (1999). Stemmen horen accepteren. Tirion, Baarn. 
Romme, M.A.J., Escher, A.D.M.A.C. (1999). Stimmenhören Akzeptieren, Neunplus 1 Berlin. Duitsland. 
Romme, Marius and Escher, Sandra: Making Sense of Voices - A guide for professionals who work with voice hearers: (2000) MIND Publications
Romme, M.A.J., Escher, A.D.M.A.C. (2003). Förstå och hantera roster. RSNH. Riksförbundet för Social och Mental Hälsa.Stockholm. Sweden 
Romme, M.A.J., Escher, A.D.M.A.C. (2003). Giv stemmerne mening. Systime Academic. Århus, Denmark. 
Romme, M.A.J., Escher, A.D.M.A.C. (2005). Managing Distressing Voice Hearing Experiences In Wellness Recovery Action Plan. Mary Ellen Copeland edited by Piers Allott. P. Sefton Recovery Group, Liverpool, UK. P. 114–118. 

Romme, M.A.J., Escher, A.D.M.A.C. (Eds.) (2013). Psychosis as a Personal Crisis: An Experience-Based Approach. Routledge.

See also
 Hearing Voices Network
 Hearing Voices Movement
 Interpretation of Schizophrenia
 Ross Institute for Psychological Trauma
 Trauma model of mental disorders
 Experience Focussed Counselling

References

External links
 Official Dutch Hearing Voices Website: In Dutch and English
 INTERVOICE Website: International Network for Training, Education and Research into Hearing Voices

1945 births
Living people
Dutch psychiatrists
Schizophrenia researchers
People in health professions from The Hague
Maastricht University alumni
Academic staff of Maastricht University
Dutch women psychiatrists